Paul Baumgartner (21 July 1903 – 19 October 1976) was a Swiss pianist.

Born in Altstätten, Switzerland, he studied piano and composition with Walter Braunfels in the Hochschule für Musik und Theater München and with Eduard Erdmann in Köln where he subsequently taught. Fleeing from the rise of the Nazis, he took up residence in Basel, in Switzerland again, where he taught in the conservatory.

A fine pianist, he was one of the musicians who rallied around the cellist Casals and played in the first Casals festival. He recorded the Bach sonatas for viola da gamba with Casals.

However, he is nowadays now mainly remembered as a teacher, numbering among his pupils Alfred Brendel, Karl Engel, Arie Vardi, Peter Efler and the conductor Günter Wand.

In 1962, he was awarded the Kunstpreis der Stadt St. Gallen. He died, in 1976, in Locarno, Switzerland.

At the age of 12, Paul Baumgartner wrote The Seven Searchers and other poems.

The Swiss painter Urban Zacharias Wick drew his lifesize portrait which is now exhibited and owned by the Kunstmuseum Rheintal.

External links
Discography at SonyBMG Masterworks

Swiss classical pianists
1903 births
1976 deaths
University of Music and Performing Arts Munich alumni
People from Altstätten
20th-century classical pianists